Edwina Hayes (born 6 June 1973, in Dublin, Ireland) is an Irish born English singer-songwriter. She grew up in Preston, Lancashire before moving to the East Riding of Yorkshire where she gained her first musical experiences playing at local folk clubs.

Solo career
Since 1999, she has played regularly in London and Nashville, establishing herself as an accomplished songwriter in the process.

She released her debut album Out on My Own in 2005. The album was co-produced by singer-songwriter Clive Gregson and featured Dr. Hook singer Dennis Locorriere on two tracks. Her single Eyes of a Stranger received regular plays on BBC Radio 2 courtesy of broadcaster Michael Parkinson.

In 2005, she toured extensively as support act to such notable performers as Jools Holland, Nanci Griffith, Ricky Ross and Loudon Wainwright III. In 2006 and 2007 she again supported Nanci Griffith.

Hayes released her second solo album, Pour Me a Drink in February 2008. Released on a small independent label it was a much simpler recording than her debut, most tracks just featuring her voice and guitar. The title track was later recorded by Nanci Griffith.

In 2009, her version of Randy Newman's "Feels Like Home" was featured in the movie My Sister's Keeper. During June 2009 Hayes supported ex-Byrd Roger McGuinn on his British tour.

Her third solo album, Good Things Happen Over Coffee, was released in 2011.

She was a finalist in the Yorkshire Gig Guide Grassroots Awards in the category of "Outstanding Band/Artist" in 2017.

She appeared at the 2021 Shrewsbury Folk Festival.

Hummingbird
In late 2006, she teamed up with fellow singer-songwriters Amy Wadge and Rosalie Deighton under the name of Hummingbird. They toured together and recorded an album, They Don’t Make Mirrors Like They Used To for release in early 2007. Before the album's release Deighton left to concentrate on her solo career and was replaced by Cathy Burton. This change in line up delayed the album's release, now to be called Tougher Than Love release was put back until August. The new line up's touring schedule included an appearance at the 2007 Glastonbury Festival, playing the Acoustic Stage on the final day of the festival.

The Mile Roses
From 2015 to mid 2018, she was a member of The Mile Roses, along with Kate Bramley and Simon Haworth. The Mile Roses toured the United Kingdom extensively and recorded a self-titled album whilst she was a member. Edwina was replaced by Kari Macleod, although she continued to tour with The Mile Roses, performing as a solo artist.

Personal life
Hayes lives in Driffield, East Riding of Yorkshire.

Discography

Albums
2004-02-28: Out On My Own, Radar, RADAR005CD
2007-06-25: Tougher Than Love (As Hummingbird), Flying Sparks Records, TDBCDA70
2007: The School Building - A Cool Compilation Of Songs For Kids From Donating Artists Round The World, Lympsham Pre-School, TSB1 (1 track "Froggie Went A Courtin'")
2008-02-22: Pour Me A Drink, Twirly Music, TWIRL01CD (Originally released in a jewel case, reissued in a digipak)
2009: My Sister's Keeper - Music From The Motion Picture, Decca Records, 271 0651 (1 track "Feels Like Home")
2010-06-10: All Night North - Songs To Words By Philip Larkin, All Night North, ANN-CD1 (1 track "This Be The Verse")
2011-02-11: Good Things Happen Over Coffee, Twirly Music, TWIRL02CD (Originally released in a jewel case, reissued in a digipak)
2014-05-23: Moonbeams Presents ........ Edwina Hayes Abbey Road Live Here Now - Album Recording Live At Driffield Town Hall 23.05.2014 (Recorded, pressed and issued on the evening to members of the audience free of charge. A very limited number were available via EdwinaHayes.com)
2017-07-16: The Mile Roses (as The Mile Roses), Tantobie Records, TTRCD116
2021: Ruby Rose, Twirly Music, TWIRL03CD

References

External links
 Official website
 MySpace page

1973 births
Living people
English women singer-songwriters
Irish emigrants to the United Kingdom
Musicians from Preston, Lancashire
21st-century English women singers
21st-century English singers